The 1994–95 NBA season was the 7th season for the Charlotte Hornets in the National Basketball Association. During the off-season, the Hornets signed free agent All-Star center Robert Parish, who won three championships with the Boston Celtics in the 1980s, and acquired Michael Adams from the Washington Bullets. After falling one game short of the playoffs the previous season, the Hornets lost their first three games, but then went on an 8-game winning streak between December and January, holding a 31–17 record at the All-Star break. The Hornets finished second in the Central Division with a solid 50–32 record, and qualified for their second playoff appearance.

Alonzo Mourning led the team with 21.3 points, 9.9 rebounds and 2.9 blocks per game, while Larry Johnson averaged 18.8 points, 7.2 rebounds and 4.6 assists per game. Mourning and Johnson were both selected for the 1995 NBA All-Star Game. In addition, Hersey Hawkins provided the team with 14.3 points and 1.5 steals per game, while sixth man Dell Curry averaged 13.6 points per game off the bench, second-year forward Scott Burrell contributed 11.5 points and 5.7 rebounds per game, and Muggsy Bogues provided with 11.1 points, 8.7 assists and 1.3 steals per game. Curry also finished in second place in Sixth Man of the Year voting, while Burrell finished tied in third place in Most Improved Player voting.

In the Eastern Conference First Round of the playoffs, the Hornets faced the 5th-seeded Chicago Bulls. Michael Jordan recently came out of his retirement and returned to play for the Bulls, as the Hornets were eliminated three games to one, losing by just one point in an 85–84 road loss to the Bulls in Game 4. The Hornets led the NBA in home-game attendance for the sixth time in seven seasons. Despite the stellar season, Johnson and Mourning had trouble getting along as teammates. Following the season, Mourning was traded to the Miami Heat after three seasons with the franchise, while Hawkins and David Wingate were both traded to the Seattle SuperSonics, and Kenny Gattison left in the 1995 NBA Expansion Draft.

For the season, the Hornets added new dark navy and purple alternate road uniforms, which both remained in use until 1997.

NBA Draft

Roster

Regular season

Standings

Record vs. opponents

Game log

Regular season

|- align="center" bgcolor="#ffcccc"
| 17
| December 8, 19948:30p.m. EST
| @ Houston
| L 95–101
| Burrell (23)
| Mourning (13)
| Bogues (9)
| The Summit12,792
| 9–8

|- align="center"
|colspan="9" bgcolor="#bbcaff"|All-Star Break
|- style="background:#cfc;"
|- bgcolor="#bbffbb"
|- align="center" bgcolor="#ffcccc"
| 50
| February 16, 19958:00p.m. EST
| Houston
| L 89–105
| Johnson (18)
| Mourning (11)
| Bogues (12)
| Charlotte Coliseum23,698
| 31–19

Playoffs

|- align="center" bgcolor="#ffcccc"
| 1
| April 28
| Chicago
| L 100–108 (OT)
| Alonzo Mourning (32)
| Alonzo Mourning (13)
| Muggsy Bogues (10)
| Charlotte Coliseum23,859
| 0–1
|- align="center" bgcolor="#ccffcc"
| 2
| April 30
| Chicago
| W 106–89
| Larry Johnson (25)
| Alonzo Mourning (20)
| Muggsy Bogues (7)
| Charlotte Coliseum23,859
| 1–1
|- align="center" bgcolor="#ffcccc"
| 3
| May 2
| @ Chicago
| L 80–103
| Larry Johnson (22)
| Alonzo Mourning (7)
| four players tied (3)
| United Center24,114
| 1–2
|- align="center" bgcolor="#ffcccc"
| 4
| May 4
| @ Chicago
| L 84–85
| Alonzo Mourning (20)
| Alonzo Mourning (13)
| Bogues, Wingate (5)
| United Center24,221
| 1–3

Player statistics

Season

Playoffs

Awards and records

Transactions
The Hornets were involved in the following transactions during the 1994–95 season.

Trades

Free agents

Additions

Subtractions

Player Transactions Citation:

References

External links
 Hornets on Database Basketball

Charlotte Hornets seasons
Char
Bob
Bob